Kennedy Peak may refer to:
 Kennedy Peak (Antarctica), a peak protruding above the continental ice near Denman Glacier, Antarctica
 Kennedy Peak (Myanmar), a peak in Chin State of Burma (Myanmar) and site of a battle in 1944

See also
 List of peaks named Kennedy
 Mount Kennedy